Christian communism is a theological view that the teachings of Jesus compel Christians to support religious communism. Although there is no universal agreement on the exact dates when communistic ideas and practices in Christianity began, many Christian communists argue that evidence from the Bible suggests that the first Christians, including the Apostles in the New Testament, established their own small communist society in the years following Jesus' death and resurrection. Many advocates of Christian communism and other communists, including Karl Kautsky, argue that it was taught by Jesus and practised by the apostles themselves. This is generally confirmed by historians.

There are those who view that the early Christian Church, such as that one described in the Acts of the Apostles, was an early form of communism and religious socialism. The view is that communism was just Christianity in practice and Jesus was the first communist. This link was highlighted in one of Karl Marx's early writings, which stated that "[a]s Christ is the intermediary unto whom man unburdens all his divinity, all his religious bonds, so the state is the mediator unto which he transfers all his Godlessness, all his human liberty."

History 
Christian communism was based on the concept of koinonia, which means common or shared life, it was not an economic doctrine but an expression of agape love. It was the voluntary sharing of goods amongst the community. Acts 4:35 records that in the early Christian Church in Jerusalem "[n]o one claimed that any of their possessions was their own, but shared everything in common." The pattern helped the early Christians to survive after the siege of Jerusalem and was taken seriously for several centuries. While it later disappeared from church history, it remained within monasticism and was an important supporting factor in the rise of feudalism. This ideal returned in the 19th century with monasticism revival and the rise of religious movements wanting to revive the early Christian egalitarianism. Because they were accused of atheism due its association with Marxism, they preferred communalism to describe their Christian communism.

Church Fathers 

The early Church Fathers, like their non-Abrahamic religious predecessors, maintained that human society had declined to its current state from a now lost egalitarian social order. Several historians view the early Christian Church, as described in the Acts of the Apostles (specifically the omnia sunt communia reference in Acts 2:44-45 and Acts 4:32-35), as an early form of communism. Among Christian communists, the view is that communism was just Christianity in practice and Jesus was a communist. Later historians across several centuries supported the reading of early church communities as communistic in structure.

European High Middle Ages 
From the High Middle Ages in Europe, various groups supporting Christian communist and rural communalist ideas were occasionally adopted by reformist Christian sects. An early 12th century proto-Protestant group originating in Lyon known as the Waldensians held their property in common in accordance with the Book of Acts but were persecuted by the Catholic Church and retreated to Piedmont.

Around 1300, the Apostolic Brethren in northern Italy were taken over by Fra Dolcino, who formed a sect known as the Dulcinians, which advocated ending feudalism, dissolving hierarchies in the church, and holding all property in common. The Peasants' Revolt in England has been an inspiration for "the medieval ideal of primitive communism", with the priest John Ball of the revolt being an inspirational figure to later revolutionaries, and having allegedly declared that "things cannot go well in England, nor ever will, until all goods are held in common."

Renaissance 
In the 16th century, English writer Thomas More, who is venerated in the Catholic Church as a saint, portrayed a society based on common ownership of property in his treatise Utopia, whose leaders administered it through the application of reason.

Reformation and early modernity 
Several groupings in the English Civil War supported this idea, especially Gerrard Winstanley's Diggers, who espoused clear communistic and agrarianist ideals. Oliver Cromwell and the Grandees' attitude to these groups was at best ambivalent and often hostile. Thomas Müntzer led a large Anabaptist communist movement during the 16th-century German Peasants' War, which Friedrich Engels analysed in The Peasant War in Germany.

The Hutterites believed in strict adherence to biblical principles and church discipline, and practised a form of communism. In the words of historians Max Stanton and Rod Janzen, the Hutterites "established in their communities a rigorous system of Ordnungen, which were codes of rules and regulations that governed all aspects of life and ensured a unified perspective. As an economic system, Christian communism was attractive to many of the peasants who supported social revolution in sixteenth century central Europe", such as the German Peasants' War, and Engels came to view Anabaptists as proto-communists.

Beginning of the Age of Enlightenment 
Criticism of the idea of private property continued into the Enlightenment era of the 18th century through such thinkers as the deeply religious Jean-Jacques Rousseau. Raised a Calvinist, Rousseau was influenced by the Jansenist movement within the Catholic Church. The Jansenist movement originated from the most orthodox Roman Catholic bishops who tried to reform the Catholic Church in the 17th century to stop secularization and Protestantism. One of the main Jansenist aims was democratizing to stop the aristocratic corruption at the top of the Church hierarchy.

Late modern period 
In Christian Europe, communists were believed to have adopted atheism. In Protestant England, communism was too close to the Catholic communion rite, hence socialist was the preferred term. Friedrich Engels argued that in 1848, when The Communist Manifesto was published, socialism was respectable in Europe while communism was not. The teachings of Jesus are frequently described as socialist, especially by Christian socialists, such as Terry Eagleton. The Owenites in England and the Fourierists in France were considered respectable socialists, while working-class movements that "proclaimed the necessity of total social change" denoted themselves communists. This branch of socialism produced the communist work of Étienne Cabet in France and Wilhelm Weitling in Germany.

In the earliest years of the Mormon movement, Joseph Smith promoted the law of consecration and the concept of the United Order. Today, some Mormon fundamentalist groups still apply this principle. Christian socialism was one of the founding threads of the Labour Party in the United Kingdom and is said to begin with the uprising of John Ball and Wat Tyler in the 14th century.

Pehr Götrek translated The Communist Manifesto into Swedish the same year it was published in German. He also wrote several works criticising the developing capitalist society from a Christian perspective. Igal Halfin of Tel Aviv University argues the Marxist ethos that aims for unity reflects the Christian universalist teaching that humankind is one and that there is only one god who does not discriminate among people.

China 

The participants of the Taiping Heavenly Kingdom rebellion, a syncretic Christian-Shenic theocratic kingdom, are viewed by the Chinese Communist Party as proto-communists. Soong Ching-ling, a Methodist, was recognized in China with the title of Honorary President of the People's Republic of China.

Basis 
Christian communists typically regard biblical texts in Acts 2 and Acts 4 as evidence that the first Christians lived in a communist society. Scholars generally agree that the Acts of the Apostles and the Gospel of Luke were written by the same person. In Luke 12:33, Jesus commands his disciples to sell what they have and give alms, and in Luke 14:33 says that no one can be his disciple who has not forsaken all his possessions. Historians generally confirm the view that a form of communism was taught by Jesus and practised by the apostles.

Among those historians who support the Christian communist view, Montero offers anthropological evidence that the practices recounted in Acts 4:32–35 were historical and were practised widely and taken seriously during at least the first two centuries of Christianity. Other biblical evidence of anti-capitalistic belief systems include Matthew 6:24, which said: "No one can serve two masters. Either you will hate the one and love the other or you will be devoted to the one and despise the other. You cannot serve both God and money." The slogan "Each according to his abilities" has biblical origins. Acts 11:29 states: "Then the disciples, every man according to his ability, determined to send relief unto the brethren which dwelt in Judaea." Additionally, the phrase "To each according to his needs" has a biblical basis in Acts 4:35, which says "to the emissaries to distribute to each according to his need".

Various authors, including Thomas Wharton Collens, José Porfirio Miranda, and José Míguez Bonino, describe biblical sources supporting a common-property society. Bonino wrote: "Is it altogether absurd to re-read the resurrection today as a death of the monopolies, the liberation from hunger, or a solidary form of ownership?" Bonino and Miranda argue against the belief that "Scripture has various meanings", which in their view allow Western conservative theologians "to prevent the Bible from revealing its own subversive message", and that "use the Biblical text ... to defend the status-quo of a pre-revolutionary situation", as summarized by Andrew Kirk. Miranda said: "I am not introducing the Bible to Marx. ... I only wish to understand what the Bible says. ... We want to take the Bible seriously."

Christian communism does not depend merely on the principles of the early apostles, and Christian communists argue that anti-capitalist ideals are deeply rooted in the Christian faith. While modern capitalism had not yet formed in the time of Jesus, his message was overwhelmingly against the love of money and greed, and in support of the poor. Christian communists see the principles of Christ as staunchly anti-capitalist in nature. Since "the love of money is a root of all kinds of evil" (1 Timothy 6:10), it seems natural for Christians to oppose a social system founded—as Christian communists argue—entirely on the love of money. Capitalism is heavily based in the collection of usury, which was condemned for centuries by the Church based in numerous scriptures. Christian opposition to the emergence of such an interest-based system largely delayed capitalist development and capitalism did not gather popular support until John Calvin endorsed capitalist practice from a religious perspective.

Groups 

Several Christian groups formerly practised common ownership and others continue to do so. They may or may not have explicitly used the English term communist for self-identification. Extant groups include:
 Aaronic Order
 Bruderhof Communities
 Church of Bible Understanding
 Church of Jesus Christ (Cutlerite)
 Evangelical Association of the Israelite Mission of the New Universal Covenant
 Gloriavale Christian Community
 Hutterites
 Jesus Christians 
 Jesus People USA
 Koinonia Partners
 Padanaram Settlement
 Reba Place Fellowship
 Shakers
 Sojourners Community
 Twelve Tribes communities

Historically, many groups have practised Christian communism, and may or may not be extant, depending on the case, including:
 Adonai-Shomo
 Amana Colonies (Community of True Inspiration is extant but no longer communal)
 Anabaptist followers of Thomas Müntzer
 Aurora Colony
 Batenburgers
 Diggers
 Dulcinians
 Jesus Army
 Labadists
 Levellers
 Harmony Society
 Oneida Community
 Peoples Temple
 Society of Separatists of Zoar
 United Order Family of Christ
 Waldensians
 Zwijndrechtse Nieuwlichters

Reception and controversy 
Both Christian communism and liberation theology stress orthopraxy in Christianity over orthodoxy. A narrative of the nature of contemporary social struggles is developed via materialist analysis utilizing historiographic concepts developed by Marx. The contemporary Paraguayan Sin Tierra operate in a very similar manner as that of the reformation era Diggers. For Camilo Torres Restrepo, the founder of a Colombian guerrilla group, the National Liberation Army, developing this orthopraxis meant celebrating the Catholic Eucharist only among those engaged in armed struggle against the army of the Colombian state while fighting alongside them. In Australia, the academic Roland Boer has attempted to synthesize Calvinism and Marxism.

In a September 1962 sermon, Martin Luther King Jr., a democratic socialist and social gospel advocate, said that "no Christian can be a communist". He stated that "basic philosophy of Christianity is unalterably opposed to the basic philosophy of communism", citing what he saw as rampant secularism and materialism in communism as evidence that communism "leaves out God". He further said that "for the communist there is no divine government or no absolute moral order, there are no fixed, immutable principles." Nevertheless, King acknowledged that "although communism can never be accepted by a Christian, it emphasizes many essential truths that must forever challenge us as Christians." He added:

The theology of Pope Francis has been described as critical of capitalism, and Pope Francis has been viewed as having some sympathy to socialist causes, with his frequent criticism of capitalism and of neoliberalism. In 2016, Francis said that the world economy is "[f]undamental terrorism, against all of Humanity". When questioned on whether or not he is a communist, Francis responded: "As for whether or not I'm a communist: I am sure that I have not said anything more than what the Church's social doctrine teaches ... maybe the impression of being a little more 'of the left' has been given, but that would be a misinterpretation." In 2013, he said: "The ideology of Marxism is wrong. But I have met many Marxists in my life who are good people, so I don't feel offended." When asked about being labeled a Leninist by a blog post in The Economist in 2014, Francis said: "The communists have stolen our flag. The flag of the poor is Christian. Poverty is at the center of the Gospel." He added that communism came "twenty centuries later".

Relation with Marxism 
Christian communists may or may not agree with various parts of Marxism, such as on the way a socialist or communist society should be organized. Christian communists also share some of the political goals of Marxists, for example replacing capitalism with socialism, which should in turn be followed by communism at a later point in the future. The young Louis Althusser and Denys Turner are among Christian or Christianity-influenced philosophers who asserted the coherence of Christianity and Marxism. Althusser said: "I became communist because I was Catholic. I did not change religion, but I remained profoundly Catholic. I don't go to church but this doesn’t matter; you don't ask people to go to church. I remained a Catholic, that is, an internationalist universalist. I thought that inside the Communist Party there were more adequate means to realize universal fraternity."

Roland Boer, the son of a Presbyterian minister, said: "There is a tradition within Marxism of engagement with religion that is usually characterised as atheistic and disinterested, but I argue there is a continuous stream of major Marxist figures who have written on questions of religion and engaged specifically with the Bible or with theological debate. Some people contend that Marxism borrowed its main ideas from Christianity and Judaism and reconstructed them as secular ideology, but I think that is extremely simplistic – the relationship is much more complex." About Karl Marx's famous quote about religion being the "opium of the people", he argues it has been largely misinterpreted, and that at that time opium was both valued and denounced for its medicinal qualities and its addictive potential. He said: "That ambivalence over religion is really what is embodied in Marx's metaphor, rather than the notion that it is just a drug that dulls the senses and makes you forget your suffering." About Christian communism, he said: "The Christian communist tradition is what really interests me and keeps me involved with religion. I am fascinated by the radical, revolutionary dimension of Christianity."

See also 

 General
 Catholicity
 Che Jesus
 Christian left
 Christian views on poverty and wealth
 Doctor Communis
 Ebionites
 "He who does not work, neither shall he eat"
 Jesus in Christianity
 Jesuism
 Jesuit reduction
 League of the Just
 Marxism and religion
 Materialism and Christianity
 The Protestant Ethic and the Spirit of Capitalism
 People
 Alain Badiou
 John Goodwyn Barmby
 Étienne Cabet
 Terry Eagleton
 Denys Turner
 Katayama Sen
 Y. T. Wu
 Slavoj Zizek
 Other Christian left perspectives
 Christian anarchism
 Christian egalitarianism
 Christian socialism

References

Bibliography

Further reading 
 David Chilton. 1982, 1986. Productive Christians in an Age of Guilt Manipulators. Tyler, Texas: The Institute for Christian Economics. . Available online for free.
 John Cort. Christian Socialism: An informal history.
 Metacosmesis: The Christian Marxism of Frederic Hastings Smyth and the Society of the Catholic Commonwealth. By Terry Brown (1987).
 Montero, Roman A. 2017. All Things in Common: The Economic Practices of the Early Christians. Eugene, Oregon: Wipf & Stock. .
 Myles, Robert J. 2019. Class Struggle in the New Testament. Lanham: Fortress Academic/Lexington Books.

External links 
 Crises In European History Socialist Labor Party says that the early Christian Church practised "pure communism". pp. 23–25 (PDF).
 Modern History Sourcebook: William Bradford From Bradford's journal Of Plymouth Plantation.
 "Preaching". March 1868. Judge Thomas Wharton Collens.
 The Sources of Early Christian Communism July 30, 2019. Church Life Journal. University of Notre Dame. Roman Montero.
 Are Christians Supposed to Be Communists? November 4, 2017. Archived from the Wayback Machine. The New York Times. Orthodox theologian David Bentley Hart.

 
Anti-capitalism
Communism
Communism
Types of socialism